Members of the World Golf Hall of Fame are annotated HoF.

African golfers